Ludo Philippaerts (born 22 June 1963) is a Belgian show jumping rider. He is a native of Genk, Limburg, Belgium.

Career
Philippaerts is a four-time Olympian. As an individual, he ranked 4th at both the 2000 Olympic Games and the 2004 Olympic Games. In Athens, the Belgian team, of which he was a part, ranked 6th. At the 1992 Summer Olympics in Barcelona, Philippaerts and his late champion horse, Darco, ranked 7th.

Philippaerts won the 2008 FEI World Cup final in Mechelen, 26–30 December 2008. At the 2006 FEI World Equestrian Games in Aachen, he had an individual rank of 9 and a team rank of 7. He competed at the World Equestrian Games twice before, in 1998 and 1990.

He was the BP Cup Champion in Spruce Meadows in 2006 and the 2006 winner of the Global Champions Tour. In 2005, his fourth consecutive year of competition in the Show Jumping World Cup, Philippaerts ranked 9th. He ranked 15th at the 1989 European Championships in Rotterdam.

Family
Philippaerts was born into an equestrian family. His brother, Johan Philippaerts, and his two older children are also show jumping riders.

He and his wife Veronique have four children:
Nicola and Olivier (twins), b.1993
Thibault, b.2001
Anthony, b.2003

See also
Equestrian at the 2000 Summer Olympics
Equestrian at the 2004 Summer Olympics
Equestrian at the 1996 Summer Olympics
Equestrian at the 1992 Summer Olympics
CSIO Spruce Meadows 'Masters' Tournament
European Show Jumping Championships

References

External links 
Official website

1963 births
Living people
Belgian show jumping riders
Belgian male equestrians
Sportspeople from Genk
Olympic equestrians of Belgium
Equestrians at the 1992 Summer Olympics
Equestrians at the 1996 Summer Olympics
Equestrians at the 2000 Summer Olympics
Equestrians at the 2004 Summer Olympics